Singapore competed at the 1966 British Empire and Commonwealth Games in Kingston, Jamaica, for the first time as an independent state. It participated in six sports but did not win any medals.

References

1966
Nations at the 1966 British Empire and Commonwealth Games
British Empire and Commonwealth Games